The Schweizer Frauenblatt ("Swiss Women's Journal") was a Swiss weekly journal in German. Its stated aim was to raise public awareness of the social, economic and political situation of women and to support women's suffrage. It was created in 1919 in Aarau.  was the first editor in charge. After her departure in 1921, the weekly started to take a less radical editorial line. It was part of the Swiss Women's Societies Alliance from 1922 to 1964. Iris von Roten was editor from 1943 to 1945. The journal switched to a monthly schedule in 1974. In 1979, it changed its title to "Mir Fraue", and in 1989 to "Zeitspiegel der Frau". It was discontinued in 1990.

References

Feminist magazines
Weekly magazines published in Switzerland